The University of the Punjab (Urdu), also referred to as Punjab University, is a public, research, coeducational higher education institution located in Lahore, Pakistan. Punjab University is the oldest public university in Pakistan.

With multiple campuses in Gujranwala, Jhelum, and Khanspur, the university was formally established by the British Government after convening the first meeting for establishing higher education institutions in October 1882 at Simla. Punjab University was the fourth university to be established by the British colonial authorities in the Indian subcontinent; the first three universities were established in other parts of British India.

There are 45,678 students (27,907 morning students, 16,552 evening students and 1,219 diploma students). The university has 13 faculties of which there are 83 academic departments, research centres, and institutes. Punjab University has ranked first among large-sized multiple faculty universities by the HEC in 2012. There are also two Nobel Laureates among the university's alumni and former staff. Additionally, the university is also a member of the Association of Commonwealth Universities of the United Kingdom. In the recently issued rankings of Asian universities by QS World Universities Rankings, the university jumped from the 232nd to 193rd position, improving its position by 39 places. It ranks 251–300 in Agriculture and Forestry, 501–550 in Physics & Astronomy and 501–550 in Chemistry according to QS World University Rankings by Subject 2019. In 2022-2023 edition, it ranked 801 worldwide.

History
The University of Punjab was given its initial impetus in 1854 by Wood's despatch.
The Institute of Administrative Sciences was created in 1962. Many major institutions that were previously affiliated to the university have become independent universities, such as Government College University, Lahore and Medical and Engineering Colleges.

On 1 January 1864, Government College University, Lahore was established. The Lieutenant Governor of Punjab Donald Friell McLeod appointed Gottlieb Wilhelm Leitner as principal of Government College University, Lahore. On 12 March 1868, a resolution was adopted at a public meeting in Lahore to establish University of the Punjab at Lahore. On 8 December 1869, Punjab University College was established in Lahore and on 14 October 1882, University of the Punjab was established.

Prof. Arthur Compton, who discovered Compton effect used to be an appointed lecturer in the university and its affiliated campus Government College University, Lahore, he received the Nobel Prize in 1927.

The fate of the university after the partition of India in 1947, was deliberated at the Punjab Partition Committee, with representatives from East Punjab advocating for a division of the university. The senate of the university voted to split the university, and the matter reached the Partition Council at the centre, but a decision could not be made. The government in East Punjab was compelled to establish a new university, which eventually became the Panjab University in Chandigarh.

Campus

The university is divided into campuses across Punjab with one summer campus located in Khyber Pakhtunkhwa:
 Allama Iqbal Campus: also known as the old campus, located in the centre of Lahore, it is named after the great South Asian thinker and mystic poet Allama Muhammad Iqbal. The campus houses the Senate, the Syndicate, the Selection Board and the Advanced Studies & Research Board are generally held there.

The campus is the centre of academic and administrative activities of the university. A canal divides the academic blocks from the student lodgings.
 Gujranwala Campus: the faculties of Commerce, Economics and Management Sciences, Banking & Finance, Law, English, and Information Technology all conduct teaching in the campus. In addition to degree programs, campus provides short courses, facilitated by e-Rozgar program of Punjab Information Technology Board .
The campus, in addition to providing research facilities, is used as a recreational center for the faculty and the students.
Jhelum Campus: having opened in 2012,  it offers studies relating to the faculties of Commerce, Economics and Management Sciences, Law and Computer Science.

Academics

Rankings

University of the Punjab is ranked 801 - 1000 Internationally in the QS World University Rankings for the year 2023 and 5th nationally. It is also ranked #145 in Asian universities by QS Rankings.

Faculties
There are 13 faculties with 10 constituent colleges, 73 departments, centres, and institutes. It has 1006 full-time and 300 part-time faculty members involved in teaching/research and over 6,000 non-teaching/supporting staff with 45,678 on campus students (27,907 Morning students, 16,552 Evening students and 1,219 Diploma students) :

 Faculty of Arts and Humanities
 Faculty of Behavioral and Social Sciences
 Faculty of Commerce
 Faculty of Economics and Management Sciences
 Faculty of Education
 Faculty of Engineering & Technology
 Faculty of Health Sciences
 Faculty of Islamic Studies
 Faculty of Law
 Faculty of Life-Sciences
 Faculty of Oriental Learning
 Faculty of Pharmacy
 Faculty of Science

Constituent colleges
 College of Art and Design
 Hailey College of Banking & Finance
 Hailey College of Commerce
 University College of Pharmacy 
 Punjab University Law College
 Punjab University College of Information Technology
 College of Statistical and Actuarial Sciences
 College of Engineering & Emerging computing
 College of Earth and Environmental Sciences
 University Oriental College lahore

Library
The library is one of the largest libraries among the universities of Pakistan. The library has more than 500,000 books, magazines and periodicals, in nine national and international languages, in print and on CD, DVD, microfilm, microfiche, video and audio cassette, and manuscript.
Punjab University Library has a two-storey building with a total area of 102,000 square feet. There are reading halls on the ground and first floors with a seating capacity of 2500 readers. The library has an internet lab. In the library there is a computerised "MLIMs" catalogue for searching material.

Notable alumni

Nobel Laureate
Har Gobind Khorana (Nobel laureate 1968 - Medicine)
Abdus Salam (Nobel laureate 1979 - Physics)

Politicians
Muhammad Iqbal (Urdu poet, philosopher, and politician)
Choudhry Rahmat Ali (Founder of the Pakistan Movement, creator of the name Pakistan)
I. K. Gujral (12th Prime Minister of India)
Yashwant Singh Parmar, founder of the Himachal Pradesh state in India
Syed Ali Shah Geelani ( Leader - Kashmiri Hurriyat, Chairman All Party Hurriyat Conference, Chairman Tehreek-e- Hurriyat, Former member Jamat-ul- islami, Jammu&Kashmir)
Yousaf Raza Gillani (Pakistani politician and former Prime Minister during 2008–2012)
Asma Jahangir (Human rights activist and lawyer, co-founder of Human Rights Commission of Pakistan)
 Liaqat Baloch (Pakistani Islamic Activist)   1975–1979 (Jamaat e Islami)

Scientists
Ishfaq Ahmad (Theoretical and Nuclear physicist, chairman of PAEC during the first atomic tests in Pakistan in 1998)
Satish Dhawan (Rocket scientist, Chairman of ISRO, Director of IISc) 
Yash Pal (Educationist and space scientist known for cosmic ray research and popularizing science education in India)
Muhammad Sharif (Relativistic astrophysicist and cosmologist)
Bilal U. Haq, marine geoscientist and laureate of France's Prestwich Prize in geology.
Muhammad Tahir Ul Qadri(Pakistani-Canadian Scholar)
F. C. Kohli Father of the Indian IT Industry
Sartaj Aziz (Pakistani economist, strategist and former NSA)
Niaz Ahmad Akhtar (SI) (Former Vice-Chancellor, University of the Punjab)
Shoaib Mansoor (Pakistani movie director)
Wasiullah Khan (Pakistani-American founder of the East–West University in Chicago)
M. D. Tahir (1942–2008), a prominent Pakistani lawyer
Manzoor Mirza (1939-2016), economist
Ather Shah Khan Jaidi, comedian, writer

References

External links
 Official website

 
Public universities and colleges in Punjab, Pakistan
Universities and colleges in Lahore
Educational institutions established in 1882
1882 establishments in British India